Alexander Crawford Monteith (April 10, 1902 – September 17, 1979) was a Senior Vice-President of the Westinghouse Electric Corporation, 
and for more than forty years a leader in the development of electric power systems.

Monteith received his education in electrical engineering at Queen's University, Kingston, Ontario.

He started as a Central Station Engineer and became Senior Vice-President of Westinghouse, 
and President the American Institute of Electrical Engineers (AIEE), 
and President of the National Electrical Manufacturers Association. He was an Honorary Member of the American Society of Mechanical Engineers (ASME) and a Fellow of the IEEE. He received the IEEE Edison Medal in 1962. He was elected to the National Academy of Engineering in 1965.

External links

References 

1902 births
1979 deaths
Canadian electrical engineers
Businesspeople from Ontario
Fellow Members of the IEEE
IEEE Edison Medal recipients
Members of the United States National Academy of Engineering